Linda Kazienko (born 29 May 1955 in Grimsby) is a former Canadian archer.

University

Kazienko attended the University of Guelph from 1974 to 1978 and graduated with a MSc in animal and poultry science. She was a member of the university archery team. Later she entered the DVM program.

Archery

Kazienko won a silver medal in the women's team recurve at the 1979 Pan American Games. In 1983 she won bronze medals in the women's individual recurve, women's individual recurve 30m, women's individual recurve 50m and a silver in the women's team recurve events.

She also competed at the 1984 Summer Olympic Games, five World Archery Championships and the 1982 Commonwealth Games

References

External links 
 Profile on worldarchery.org

1955 births
Living people
Canadian female archers
Olympic archers of Canada
Archers at the 1982 Commonwealth Games
Archers at the 1979 Pan American Games
Archers at the 1983 Pan American Games
Pan American Games medalists in archery
Pan American Games silver medalists for Canada
Pan American Games bronze medalists for Canada
Archers at the 1984 Summer Olympics
People from Grimsby, Ontario
University of Guelph alumni
Medalists at the 1983 Pan American Games
Commonwealth Games competitors for Canada